Daniela Kuffelová (born 12 November 1965) is a Slovak actress. At the 2008 DOSKY Awards she won in the category of Best Actress, for her performances in the play Matka. Kuffelová received a nomination in the same category in the 2016 awards, for her role as Karolin in the play  at the Andrej Bagar Theatre, but the eventual winner was Petra Vajdová.

References

External links

1965 births
Living people
Slovak stage actresses
Slovak television actresses
Actors from Trnava
20th-century Slovak actresses
21st-century Slovak actresses